Elis Manolova (born 17 January 1996) is a Bulgarian-born Azerbaijani freestyle wrestler. At the 2019 World Wrestling Championships held in Nur-Sultan, Kazakhstan, she won one of the bronze medals in the women's 65 kg event. She is also a gold medalist and a three-time silver medalist at the European Wrestling Championships. She represented Azerbaijan at the 2020 Summer Olympics in Tokyo, Japan.

Career 

She represented Bulgaria in several cadet wrestling events before switching to Azerbaijan in 2015. As one of her first senior level competitions, she competed in the women's 69 kg event at the 2015 World Wrestling Championships held in Las Vegas, United States. She was eliminated in her first match by Elmira Syzdykova of Kazakhstan. In 2016, she competed at the European Olympic Qualification Tournament hoping to qualify for the 2016 Summer Olympics in Rio de Janeiro, Brazil. She did not qualify for the Olympics and she also lost her bronze medal match against Alina Berezhna of Ukraine. A month later, she tried again at the World Olympic Qualification Tournament held in Istanbul, Turkey but she could no longer qualify after losing her first match against Monika Michalik of Poland. Michalik went on to qualify for the 2016 Summer Olympics and she also became one of the bronze medalists in the women's 63 kg event.

In 2017, she won one of the bronze medals in the women's 69 kg event at the Golden Grand Prix Ivan Yarygin held in Krasnoyarsk, Russia. A few months later, in May 2017, she lost her bronze medal match in the women's 69 kg event at the European Wrestling Championships held in Novi Sad, Serbia. In that same month, at the Islamic Solidarity Games held in Baku, Azerbaijan, she won the gold medal in the women's 69 kg event. In the final, she defeated Zhamila Bakbergenova of Kazakhstan. Lastly, she also competed in the women's 69 kg event at the 2017 World Wrestling Championships held in Paris, France.

In 2018, at the European Wrestling Championships held in Kaspiysk, Dagestan, Russia, she won the silver medal in the women's 65 kg event. In 2019, she won the gold medal in that event. The following year, she won the silver medal in the 65 kg event at the 2020 European Wrestling Championships held in Rome, Italy. In that same year, she also won one of the bronze medals in the women's 65 kg event at the 2020 Individual Wrestling World Cup held in Belgrade, Serbia.

In March 2021, she competed at the European Qualification Tournament in Budapest, Hungary hoping to qualify for the 2020 Summer Olympics in Tokyo, Japan. She won her first two matches but then lost her match in the semi-finals against Khanum Velieva. In April 2021, she was eliminated in her second match in the 68 kg event at the European Wrestling Championships held in Warsaw, Poland. In May 2021, she qualified at the World Olympic Qualification Tournament to represent Azerbaijan at the 2020 Summer Olympics.

She competed in the women's 68 kg event at the 2020 Summer Olympics where she lost her first match against eventual silver medalist Blessing Oborududu of Nigeria. She was then eliminated in the repechage by eventual bronze medalist Meerim Zhumanazarova of Kyrgyzstan. Two months after the Olympics, she competed in the women's 65 kg event at the 2021 World Wrestling Championships held in Oslo, Norway where she was eliminated in her first match by Koumba Larroque of France.

In 2022, she won one of the bronze medals in the 65 kg event at the Dan Kolov & Nikola Petrov Tournament held in Veliko Tarnovo, Bulgaria. She lost her bronze medal match in her event at the Yasar Dogu Tournament held in Istanbul, Turkey.

In April 2022, she won the silver medal in the 65 kg event at the European Wrestling Championships held in Budapest, Hungary. A few months later, she also won the silver medal in the 65 kg event at the 2021 Islamic Solidarity Games held in Konya, Turkey. She lost her bronze medal match in the 65kg event at the 2022 World Wrestling Championships held in Belgrade, Serbia.

Achievements

References

External links 

 

Living people
1996 births
Place of birth missing (living people)
Bulgarian emigrants to Azerbaijan
Naturalized citizens of Azerbaijan
Azerbaijani female sport wrestlers
Bulgarian female sport wrestlers
World Wrestling Championships medalists
European Wrestling Championships medalists
Islamic Solidarity Games medalists in wrestling
Islamic Solidarity Games competitors for Azerbaijan
Wrestlers at the 2020 Summer Olympics
Olympic wrestlers of Azerbaijan
21st-century Bulgarian women
21st-century Azerbaijani women